The 15th Central American and Caribbean Age Group Championships in Athletics were hosted by the Curaçaose Atletiek Bond (CAB), and were held at the Sentro Deportivo Korsou in Brievengat, Curaçao between July 29–30, 2013.

Medal summary
Complete results were published.

Team trophies
The results for the team trophies were published.

Medal table (unofficial)

Participation
The published competition results  report the participation of 156 athletes in 23 teams from 22 countries.  The announced athletes from the Cayman Islands, Dominica, and Honduras did not appear in the results lists.

 (8)
 (6)
 (8)
 (8)
 (8)
 (8)
 (8)
 A  (8)
 B  (8)
 (8)
 (2)
 (4)
/ (8)
 (4)
 (8)
 (6)
 (8)
 (7)
 (6)
 (6)
 (8)
 (4)
 (7)

References

External links
Official CACAC Website
Championships website

Central American and Caribbean Age Group Championships in Athletics
Athletics in Curaçao
Central American and Caribbean Age Group Championships in Athletics
Central American and Caribbean Age Group Championships in Athletics
Athletic
Athletic
Willemstad
International sports competitions hosted by Curaçao
2013 in youth sport